Jeff Coetzee and Rogier Wassen were the defending champions, but Coetzee chose not to participate, and only Wassen competed that year.
Wassen partnered with Jean-Claude Scherrer, but lost in the first round to Steve Darcis and Marc Gicquel.

Mario Ančić and Jürgen Melzer won in the final 7–6(5), 6–3, against Mahesh Bhupathi and Leander Paes.

Seeds

Draw

Draw

External links
 Draw

Doubles
Ordina Open